Yarritu is a family name of Spanish Basque origin which means graceful bridge.

Coat of arms 
The gentlemen's Major Stamp was received by the Yarritu family in Bilbao and in the Real Chancillery in Valladolid in 1726, 1790, and 1798. As a result, the coat of arms was designed in a field of silver with three black smelting basins, forming a triangle, with a golden band stretched across the center. The emblem states (English translation): "Going well, they will not suffer".

People with the surname Yarritu
 David Yarritu, member of ABC (band), a 1980s new wave band

Notes

Basque-language surnames